This is a list of rivers in Cameroon. This list is arranged by drainage basin, with respective tributaries indented under each larger stream's name.

Gulf of Guinea
Niger River (Nigeria)
Benue River
Katsina Ala River
Menchum River
Donga River
Faro River
Déo River
Mayo Kébbi
Cross River (Manyu River)
Akwayafe River
Rio del Ray
Meme River
Mungo River
Wouri River
Makombé River
Nkam River
Dibamba River
Sanaga River
Mbam River
Ndjim River
Noun River
Kim River
Lom River
 Pangar River
Djeréme River
Nyong River
Lokundje River
Campo River (Ntem River)

Atlantic Ocean
Ogooué River (Gabon)
Ivindo River (Gabon)
Aïna River (Ayina River)
Lélé River
Congo River (Republic of the Congo)
Sangha River
Dja River (Ngoko River)
Boumba River
Sangha River
Ngoko River
Kadéï River
Boumbé II River
Doumé River

Lake Chad
Chari River
Logone River
Mbéré River
Vina River

References
Prentice-Hall, Inc., American World Atlas 1985
 GEOnet Names Server

Cameroon
Rivers